Blackfoot River Wildlife Management Area at  is an Idaho wildlife management area in Caribou County near the town of Soda Springs. The location of the WMA along the Blackfoot River was homesteaded by the Rasmussen family in 1883. It was sold to John Jay Stocking in 1907 and remained in the family for 3 generations before being purchased by the Conservation Fund in 1994, which sold it to the Idaho Department of Fish and Game. 

The WMA was established to provide access to and improve westslope cutthroat trout habitat and other game species. Moose, elk, and mule deer are the most common large game species found in the WMA.

References

Protected areas established in 1994
Protected areas of Caribou County, Idaho
Wildlife management areas of Idaho